The Ward (titled onscreen as John Carpenter's The Ward) is a 2010 American supernatural psychological horror film directed by John Carpenter and starring Amber Heard, Mamie Gummer, Danielle Panabaker, Laura-Leigh, Lyndsy Fonseca and Jared Harris. Set in 1966, the film chronicles a young woman who is institutionalized after setting fire to a house, and who finds herself haunted by the ghost of a former inmate at the psychiatric ward.

The film was shot on location at the Eastern State Hospital in Medical Lake, Washington.

Plot
In rural Oregon, at the Coos Bay Psychiatric Hospital in 1966, a young patient named Tammy is killed by an unseen force at night.

Kristen (Amber Heard), a troubled young woman, sets fire to an abandoned farmhouse and is arrested. The local police take her to Coos Bay, where she meets the other patients in the ward: artistic Iris (Lyndsy Fonseca), seductive Sarah (Danielle Panabaker), wild Emily (Mamie Gummer), and child-like Zoey (Laura-Leigh). Kristen is taken to a room previously occupied by their friend, Tammy, and  meets therapist, Dr. Stringer (Jared Harris). She reveals that she is unable to recall anything about her past. She is attacked by a horribly deformed figure that had been staring at her earlier, but upon telling the nurse this, she is drugged and put through intense electroshock therapy.

Dr. Stringer uses hypnotherapy to unlock Iris's hidden memories. After the session, Iris is killed by transorbital lobotomy by the deformed figure. Kristen finds Iris' sketch of her attacker with the name 'Alice Hudson', a former patient at the hospital. That night, Kristen and Emily attempt to find Iris and escape. However, Kristen is thwarted by Alice, and loses consciousness while Emily is caught.

Sarah is killed by Alice. Kristen discovers that all of the girls had killed Alice together because Alice constantly hurt them. Now she is after the girls for revenge. Kristen tries to talk Emily down from attempting suicide but Alice kills her by slitting her throat with a scalpel. Kristen plans to escape again by holding Zoey as a pretend hostage but is drugged and placed in a straitjacket. She escapes it and she and Zoey try to get out. Zoey is killed by Alice off-screen. After a lengthy chase, Kristen seemingly manages to destroy Alice. She finds Alice's file in Dr. Stringer's office, which has each of the girls' names, including Kristen herself.

Dr. Stringer, catching her in his office, reveals that Kristen is actually one of many personalities of the real Alice Hudson, who was kidnapped at age eleven, eight years earlier, and left chained for two months in the basement of the same farmhouse Kristen burned down. In order to survive the trauma, she developed Dissociative Identity Disorder, creating each one of the girls from the ward as a different personality. Over time, Alice's own personality became so overwhelmed by the others that she became lost. Dr. Stringer attempted experimental techniques to bring Alice's own personality back, resulting in the manifestation of Ghost Alice, who destroyed the individual personalities one by one. Her treatments were working until 'Kristen' appeared, as an attempt of Alice's mind to protect the other personalities so she wouldn't need to face her trauma.

At the end of the movie, Alice packs a suitcase with her belonging as she prepares to leave the hospital. When she opens the medicine cabinet above her sink, Kristen lunges out at her.

Cast
Amber Heard as Kristen, the main protagonist. A girl with no memories of her life but the strong belief that she is not crazy. She feels the constant need to escape the ward no matter the cost. She is the first in noticing the other girls are disappearing and that a vengeful ghost might be the one behind it.
Mamie Gummer as Emily. She is tough and free-spirited but also the one who mostly acts in wild, insane manner, annoys the other patients, and calls everyone crazy, which often starts conflict among girls especially between her and Sarah. Initially, she tries to intimidate and scare Kristen, but eventually, Kristen's strength makes her admire her. She hides a guilty feeling inside her though it seems unlikely she will open to it.
Danielle Panabaker as Sarah, a vain, beautiful redhead and the flirtatious one of the group. She flirts with a male nurse but is turned down because she is a mental patient. She often puts down the other girls through her snobbish and snooty disposition.
Laura-Leigh as Zoey, a girl who has suffered emotional trauma so severe that she keeps acting and dressing like a little girl. She carries around a stuffed rabbit everywhere she goes. She seems oppressed by the others due to her instant trust in Kristen.
Lyndsy Fonseca as Iris, artistically talented and prim and proper, she is the first of the girls in befriending Kristen. She is nice and kind to everyone. She also carries a sketchbook where she likes to draw. She seems to be the most aware of their situation in the ward since she explains to Kristen everything about their seclusion.
Mika Boorem as Alice, a girl who used to be a patient at the ward but is nowhere to be found anymore. Kristen tries to find out what happened to her during her time at the Ward.
Jared Harris as Dr. Stringer, the girls' psychiatrist. He seems hopeful in curing Kristen, though his real intentions seem mysterious the whole time.
Sydney Sweeney as Young Alice, a young girl who Kristen sees in flashbacks, both hands chained in a cellar. Nothing is really explained about her in the beginning.
Dan Anderson as Roy, the chief orderly at the ward. Serious and unpredictable, tries to maintain order inside the ward. He is the main target of Sarah's flirting.
Susanna Burney as Nurse Lundt, the chief nurse at the ward. Tends to consider Kristen a loose end, and constantly tries to act without the authority of Dr. Stringer.
Sali Sayler as Tammy, a girl who disappears from the ward unexpectedly. Her disappearance upsets the other girls. Her empty room is later occupied by Kristen. She is the mastermind behind Alice's "death" at the hands of the girls.
Mark Chamberlin as Mr. Hudson, the sad man (as Emily describes him and his wife). They constantly visit the ward and are often seen watching the girls from a window.
Jillian Kramer as Monster Alice, the ghost responsible for the disappearances. Using surgical tools as torture means on her victims. Not much is clear about her other than the fact that she is getting rid of the girls one by one.

Production

The film marks a return for Carpenter after a ten-year hiatus of not making any films; his last was the 2001 film Ghosts of Mars. According to Carpenter, "I was burned out...I had fallen out of love with cinematic storytelling". Despite this, in the meantime he had done two episodes for the anthology TV show  Masters of Horror. Carpenter said that the series reminded him of why he fell in love with the craft in the first place. Carpenter said that the script "came along at the right time for me", and he was particularly fascinated by how the film took place within a single location.

The film was shot on location in Spokane, Washington, and at the Eastern State Hospital in Medical Lake, Washington. The film was shot at a real operating mental hospital, and the crew was caged in to prevent patients from intervening.

Release
The first footage revealed from the film was on French channel Canal+. The film premiered on September 13 at the 2010 Toronto International Film Festival. The Ward was released in the UK on January 21, 2011. After its debut in a handful of film festivals in late 2010, The Ward was released in a few US theatres on July 8, 2011, where it grossed $7,760. The worldwide gross was $5.3 million. It was released on DVD and Blu-ray Disc in the US on August 16, 2011, and in the UK on October 17, 2011.

Reception
The Ward received generally negative reviews. Rotten Tomatoes, a review aggregator, reports that 33% of 72 surveyed critics gave the film a positive review; the average rating is 4.5/10. The site's consensus states: "Lacking the hallmarks of his best work, The Ward proves to be a disappointingly mundane swan song for director John Carpenter." Metacritic rated it 38/100 based on 18 reviews.

Dennis Harvey of Variety wrote, "As usual Carpenter uses the widescreen frame with aplomb, but pic suffers from too little character detailing (even if a late twist explains that), rote scares, and emphasis on a hectic pace over atmosphere." Michael Rechtshaffen of The Hollywood Reporter called it "an atmospheric supernatural thriller that has been stripped of the filmmaker's later excesses". Tim Grierson of Screen International wrote, "Tight as a drum and plenty of fun, John Carpenter's first film in nine years is hardly a groundbreaker, but when the execution is this expert, why complain?" Film Journal International wrote, "Genre veteran John Carpenter's sleekly professional ghost story is well-acted and directed but sadly derivative. Horror fans have seen it all before." The Guardian'''s Phelim O'Neill also considered the film to be unoriginal, but nevertheless "a well-made film, with some finely crafted shocks"

Jeannette Catsoulis of The New York Times wrote that the film "continues the painful decline of a director who seems more nostalgic for past glories than excited about new ideas".  Robert Abele of the Los Angeles Times wrote that the film "feels like a foot-wetting exercise rather than a full-bodied romp in familiar waters". Owen Gleiberman of Entertainment Weekly rated it B− and wrote, "While he does bring his trademark craftsmanship to this snake-pit mental-asylum thriller, the picture has too many old-movie bits rattling around in it." Adam Nayman of Fangoria wrote, "The problem with The Ward is not so much its lack of style as the fact that the director doesn't seem to have much interest in the material".  David Harley of Bloody Disgusting rated it 1/5 stars and wrote, "If someone other than Carpenter had been at the helm of The Ward, then no one would be talking about it." Serena Whitney of Dread Central rated it 3.5/5 stars and wrote, "John Carpenter's The Ward'' is a mediocre thriller that lacks any true original scares and blatantly rips off a twist ending from a far better film."

References

Further reading
Interviews:

External links

 
 
 
 

2010 films
2010 horror films
2010 independent films
2010 psychological thriller films
American psychological thriller films
American supernatural horror films
American independent films
Films about dissociative identity disorder
Films shot in Washington (state)
Films set in 1966
Films set in Oregon
Films set in psychiatric hospitals
Films directed by John Carpenter
2010s English-language films
2010s American films